Penelope High School is a 1A public high school located in Penelope, Texas (USA). It is part of the Penelope Independent School District located in north central Hill County. In 2011, the school was rated "Academically Acceptable" by the Texas Education Agency.

Athletics
The Penelope Wolverines compete in the following sports:

Basketball
Cross Country
6-Man Football
Track and Field
Volleyball

The school and town were chronicled in the book "Where Dreams Die Hard" by Carlton Stowers, which follows the team for an entire season of football (after dropping the sport for 40 years, the school resumed play in 2000).  In 2007, Penelope made the football playoffs for the first time in school history, though it lost in the first round.

State Titles
One Act Play - 
1976(B), 1981(1A)

References

External links
Penelope ISD
List of Six-man football stadiums in Texas

Schools in Hill County, Texas
Public high schools in Texas
Public middle schools in Texas
Public elementary schools in Texas